Gerald Mortimer (1937 – 30 December 2013) was an English author and sports journalist, whose career spanned over four decades.

Mortimer began his career in July 1970, as a sports journalist for the Derby Telegraph (then Derby Evening Telegraph), a job which he held until his death in December 2013.

Gerald Mortimer died following declining health on the night of 30 December 2013, aged 77.

References

1937 births
2013 deaths
English sports journalists
English writers